The murder of Vanessa Guillén, a 20-year-old United States Army soldier, took place inside an armory at Fort Hood, Texas, on April22, 2020, when she was bludgeoned to death by another soldier, Aaron David Robinson. Guillén had been missing for over two months when some of her dismembered remains were found buried along the Leon River on June30. Upon hearing about the discovery, Robinson fled Fort Hood and fatally shot himself when law enforcement attempted to apprehend him in nearby Killeen, Texas. 

Cecily Aguilar, a local woman identified by authorities as Robinson's girlfriend, was taken into custody and is alleged to have assisted him in dismembering and burying Guillén's body. On July2, 2020, Aguilar was charged with one federal count of conspiracy to tamper with evidence. On July13, 2021, she was indicted on eleven counts by a federal grand jury. On November 29, 2022 Aguilar plead guilty to accessory to murder after the fact and three counts of making a false statement.

People involved 

 Vanessa Guillén, 20, was from Houston, Texas. She was born in Ben Taub Hospital in Houston on September30, 1999, to parents Rogelio and Gloria Guillén, who originated from Zacatecas State in Mexico. She had five siblings. Guillén attended Hartman Middle School and, according to her family, graduated from César E. Chávez High School in 2018 in the top 15% of her class. She played soccer, loved to jog, and enjoyed sports and learning. Guillén joined the United States Army in June 2018 and trained as a 91F, Small Arms and Artillery Repairer. Guillén was posthumously advanced from Private First Class to the rank of Specialist on July1, 2020.
 Aaron David Robinson, 20, was from Calumet City, Illinois, a southern suburb of Chicago. Robinson joined the United States Army in October 2017 and trained as a 12B, Combat Engineer. He held the rank of E4 Specialist at the time of his death.
 Cecily Anne Aguilar, 22, described by authorities as the girlfriend of Robinson and the estranged wife of another soldier.

Investigation
She was last seen around 1:00 p.m. on April22, 2020, in the parking lot of her unit, the Regimental Engineer Squadron Headquarters of the 3rd Cavalry Regiment (3CR). Her car keys, identification card, bank card, and barracks key were found inside the armory where she worked. Guillén's family felt she disappeared under suspicious circumstances. The case was investigated under the jurisdiction of the U.S. Army Criminal Investigation Command (CID) and the Federal Bureau of Investigation (FBI) with local law enforcement agencies in Bell County, Killeen, and Belton; the Texas Parks and Wildlife Department; the United States Marshals Service; and the Texas Ranger Division in support. Multiple Fort Hood units, including 3CR, began searching the area within two weeks of her disappearance.

Before Guillén went missing, she had told her family that she was being sexually harassed by an unnamed sergeant at Fort Hood, and that complaints by other female soldiers made against the sergeant had been dismissed. Guillén's mother advised her to report the matter, but she responded that "she could put a stop to it herself" out of fear that her mother would be harmed for making a report. In early June, Guillén's mother told reporters she did not trust the Army's handling of the investigation and her attorney, Natalie Khawam, said she believed the family was "being kept in the dark" because few details had been released regarding the disappearance. On June13, 2020, hundreds of people assembled at the gates of Fort Hood to protest what organizers felt was a lack of information on the case. CID reported that they found no evidence that Guillén was assaulted, but said investigators believed foul play was involved in her disappearance. 

On June17, the League of United Latin American Citizens added a $25,000 reward to the existing $25,000 reward announced by the Army for finding Guillén. On June 23, Congresswoman Sylvia Garcia, in whose district Guillén's family resides, met with Fort Hood officials to discuss the ongoing search. The authorities said that more than 300 interviews and over 10,000 hours were spent investigating Guillén's disappearance. On July 27, 2020, Guillén's mother, who had previously been detained for illegal immigration, was granted parole in place by the U.S. Department of Homeland Security through the assistance of Garcia and immigration attorney Luis Gomez Alfaro.

Discovery of remains 
On June30, 2020, Army investigators were called in when contractors discovered partial human remains along the Leon River in Belton. The area had previously been searched by Texas Rangers, detectives, and cadaver dogs on June20 after a burn mound was discovered nearby. Investigators theorized that the remains, previously buried under concrete, had been dug up by wildlife. Tim Miller, Director of Texas EquuSearch, stated that it was the most sophisticated burial site he had ever seen.

Later that evening, at around 8:30p.m., authorities re-interviewed Cecily Anne Aguilar, a local woman who was the estranged wife of a soldier at Fort Hood. Aguilar was reported to be the girlfriend of Aaron David Robinson, a specialist ranked enlisted soldier who was one of the last known people to see Guillén on the day of her disappearance and who had previously been interviewed by investigators. Aguilar told police that Robinson had confessed to her that he had killed a female soldier at Fort Hood. At the request of law enforcement, Aguilar placed a controlled telephone call to Robinson, who said, "Baby, they found pieces", and texted Robinson multiple news articles, to which he never denied anything in response. According to a criminal complaint filed in the Western District Court of Texas, Aguilar allegedly helped Robinson dismember and dispose of Guillén's body on April22, 2020, after Robinson told her he had bludgeoned Guillén to death with a hammer inside the armory.

Arrests 
On the evening of June30, Robinson escaped the custody of an unarmed guard from his unit and fled Fort Hood after hearing the news of the discovery of remains. He had been detained by his unit at the request of a CID agent under the pretense of violating COVID-19 quarantine rules. In the early hours of July1, Killeen police located and attempted to make contact with Robinson, who produced a handgun and killed himself before he could be taken into custody. 

Aguilar was arrested by Texas Rangers and held at the Bell County Jail. On July2, Bell County officials stated Aguilar would be transferred to federal custody due to being charged with one count of conspiracy to tamper with evidence by the United States Attorney's Office Western District of Texas. Assistant United States Attorneys Mark Frazier and Greg Gloff are prosecuting the case on behalf of the federal government.

Motive 
On May 24, 2022 the Texas Department of Public Safety released a report stating that "Aguilar later explained why Robinson killed Guillen, saying Guillen saw Robinson's cellphone lock screen, which contained a picture of Aguilar. (Robinson) told her he was worried about getting in trouble for violating the Army's fraternization rules since Aguilar was still married to another soldier and he hit Guillen in the head with a hammer."

Timeline 
 April 22, 2020: According to law enforcement, Guillén is murdered with a hammer inside an armory by Robinson, who then uses a trunk to remove her body from Fort Hood and gets help from Aguilar in dismembering the remains before burying them along the Leon River.
 April 23: CID was notified by a commissioned officer in the 3CR Provost Marshal that then-PFC Guillén was reported missing. 
 April 24: CID issues a missing soldier letter for Guillen. Fort Hood Military Police issue a Be on the Lookout (BOLO) advisory to surrounding law enforcement agencies. Military personnel along with civilian and military police began a search.
 April 26: According to law enforcement tracking of cellphone data, Robinson and Aguilar return to the Leon River site and further break down Guillén's remains.
 April 28: CID interviews Robinson for the first time.
 April 30: Secretary of the Army Ryan D. McCarthy makes the following statement in a COVID-19 press briefing:  "I'd like to start out this morning by talking about a missing soldier, Private First Class Vanessa Guillen, in hopes of increasing the public's awareness and assistance in finding her. Private First Class Guillen went missing on April22 from Fort Hood, Texas. In concert with local law enforcement efforts, the Army will continue aggressively searching for her. Our hearts go out to her family, and we will not stop looking for her until we find her."
 May 18: Two witnesses are interviewed who observed Robinson struggling with a "tough box" outside of the armory.
 May 19: Robinson consents to a search of his cell phone by law enforcement using a Universal Forensic Extraction Device product.
 June 19: Aguilar is interviewed for the first time.
 June 21: Cell phone data from both Robinson and Aguilar lead law enforcement officials to an area near the Leon River. Law enforcement officials locate the burned lid of a Pelican transport case, but fail to find a body.

 June 30: At about 1:00p.m., contractors working on a fence near the Leon River discover partial human remains (that would later be confirmed to be Guillen) and notify law enforcement. CID and partner agencies discover human remains. At about 8:30p.m., Aguilar was interviewed again and told law enforcement officials about the killing. Robinson fled Fort Hood.
 July 1: In the early hours, shortly after midnight Robinson killed himself when approached by law enforcement in Killeen, Texas.
 July 2: FBI formally submits a criminal complaint for Aguilar. Fort Hood and CID hold a press briefing.
 July 5: Remains are confirmed to be Vanessa Guillén.
 July 10: U.S. Secretary of the Army Ryan D. McCarthy announced that he would order a "full independent review" of the case.
July 13: Cecily Aguilar is indicted on 11 counts relating to the death of Vanessa Guillen by a federal grand jury.
 July 30: Vanessa Guillen's family meets with President Donald Trump who emphasized to the family that the case would be fully and independently reviewed. 
December 8: Following the independent review, McCarthy announced in a Pentagon press briefing, that 14 "senior officers" from corps to squad level were disciplined for "leadership failures".
November 29, 2022: Cecily Aguilar, 24, pleaded guilty in a federal court in Waco, Texas, to one count of accessory to murder after the fact and three counts of making a false statement, according to the U.S. Attorney’s Office.

Memorials 
A mural in honor of Guillén was created in her hometown of Houston by a local artist. The mural portrays her with the flags of both the United States and Mexico, the latter due to her Mexican American ethnicity. Another mural is dedicated to her at Taqueria del Sol in the Park Place neighborhood. Multiple people also wrote corridos (songs) about her.

On July6, 2020, at city hall in Richmond, California, a memorial of candles along with tea lights spelling out “Vanessa” were displayed in front of a makeshift altar. Hundreds of people gathered to honour Guillén and other victims of sexual violence and mistreatment within the military.

On April19, 2021, Lieutenant General Robert P. White, commander of III Corps and Fort Hood unveiled that one out of the 27 gates that grant entry to Fort Hood will be renamed "The Vanessa Guillén Gate" with a plaque in her honor. The gate is also the main entry point to the 3rd Cavalry Regiment, where Guillén worked in an arms room as a small arms repairer.

In 2022 the Park Place post office was renamed after Guillén.

Later developments 

Guillén's family called for justice and improvement of the way claims of sexual harassment are handled by the military. Guillén's mother stated publicly that she had spoken to witnesses who heard two shots at the moment of Robinson's death, and stated her belief that Robinson was executed by authorities as part of a coverup involving senior members of the military.

On July10, 2020, the Secretary of the Army Ryan D. McCarthy announced that he would order a "full independent review" of Guillén's case.

On July30, 2020, Guillen's family met with President Donald Trump regarding her murder.

On December8, 2020, McCarthy announced the results of the investigation, disciplining 14 U.S. commanders and other leaders at Fort Hood, citing multiple "leadership failures". The investigation found that there was a "permissive environment for sexual assault and sexual harassment at Fort Hood."  Among those disciplined by McCarthy were Major General Scott L. Efflandt, Colonel Ralph Overland and Command Sergeant Major Bradley Knapp. The Army suspended Major General Jeffery Broadwater and Command Sergeant Major Thomas C. Kenny, pending the outcome of a new investigation into the 1st Cavalry Division's command climate and program for preventing and responding to sexual harassment and assault. Disciplinary measures were also taken against soldiers and leaders assigned below brigade level, however the Army does not, as a matter of policy, "...release the names of the battalion level and below commanders and leaders who received administrative action."

During the December8 Pentagon press conference McCarthy said that Guillén's murder "shocked our conscience and brought attention to deeper problems" at Fort Hood and across the Army more widely. He said it "forced us to take a critical look at our systems, our policies, and ourselves."

Broadwater did not receive any disciplinary action following an investigation of the 1st Cavalry Division's command climate and turned command of the Division over to Major General John B. Richardson in July 2021. Broadwater was subsequently assigned as deputy commander of V Corps at Fort Knox, Kentucky.

On January26, 2022, President Joe Biden signed an Executive Order that established sexual harassment as a specific offense under the UCMJ.

See also 
 List of solved missing person cases
 Me Too movement
 Murder of Tracie McBride – kidnapping and murder of a soldier from a military base in Texas
 Sexual harassment in the military

References

External links 

 Find Vanessa Guillén website
 US Army crowdsources ideas to combat sexual assault crisis By SARAH BLAKE MORGAN February 26, 2021

2020 in military history
2020 in Texas
2020 murders in the United States
2020s missing person cases
21st-century history of the United States Army
April 2020 crimes in the United States
Female murder victims
Formerly missing people
Fort Hood
History of women in Texas
Missing person cases in Texas
People murdered in Texas
United States military scandals
Violence against women in the United States
Hammer assaults